Bab Tuma (meaning: "Gate of Thomas") is an area of the Old City of Damascus in Syria, and is also the name of one of the seven gates inside the historical walls of the city, which is a geographic landmark of Early Christianity. The gate was named by the Byzantines to commemorate Saint Thomas the Apostle, one of the twelve apostles of Jesus Christ. The Romans first built the seven gates, and during their era, the gate was dedicated to Venus. The current gate was reconstructed by the Ayyubids in the 13th century.

History
Famous historical residents of the borough of Bab Tuma include Saint Paul (hence expressions such as "a road to Damascus experience"); Saint Thomas the Apostle himself, who, after lending his name to the neighborhood, went on to explore India; Saint Ananias; French writer Alphonse de Lamartine; Greek Orthodox theologian Saint Joseph of Damascus, founder of the Damascus Patriarchal School; Saint Raphael of Brooklyn, the first Eastern Orthodox Bishop of New York City (sent there by the Czar Nicholas II of Russia in 1895); and Syrian-born philosopher Michel Aflaq, founder of the Ba'ath Party and ba'athist ideology. 

In the 16th century, following the conquest of Antioch and Alexandretta by the Ottoman Empire after the Battle of Marj Dabiq, the area of Bab Tuma became the seat of the Greek Orthodox Church of Antioch and the Melkite Greek Catholic Church for the Northern Levant (Syria, Lebanon and Southern Turkey), as well as or the Syriac Orthodox Church, with the Cathedral of Saint George, since 1959.

Gallery

References

Gates of Damascus
Christian communities in Syria